Pierre-Luc Labbé (born May 14, 1984) is a former professional Canadian football linebacker for the Winnipeg Blue Bombers of the Canadian Football League. He was drafted in the sixth round with the 47th pick of the 2008 CFL Draft by the Winnipeg Blue Bombers. He played CIS Football for the Sherbrooke Vert et Or.

External links
Just Sports Stats
Winnipeg Blue Bombers bio

1984 births
Players of Canadian football from Quebec
Canadian football linebackers
French Quebecers
Living people
Sportspeople from Quebec City
Sherbrooke Vert et Or football players
Winnipeg Blue Bombers players